Post Scriptum (abbreviated as PS) is a tactical first-person shooter video game set during World War II (specifically during the Battle of France, Operation Overlord, Operation Market Garden and the Battle of the Bulge). It was developed by French studio Periscope Games and released on 9 August 2018. It is published by Offworld Industries through Steam and was initially developed as a mod for Offworld Industries' Squad before the Periscope Games team turned from modding team to company with the help of Offworld Industries, and Post Scriptum became its own standalone game. The game features several playable factions, these being the US, UK, France and Germany, with each faction having multiple different playable units.

References

External links 
 

2018 video games
Asymmetrical multiplayer video games
First-person shooters
Multiplayer online games
Tactical shooter video games
Unreal Engine games
Video games developed in the United Kingdom
Video games set in the Netherlands
Video games set in France
Video games set in Belgium
Windows games
Windows-only games
World War II first-person shooters